The State Poet of Florida is the poet laureate for the U.S. state of Florida. Poets Laureate of Florida are appointed by the governor and the Division of Arts and Culture. They first served lifetime, unpaid appointments, until June 20, 2014, when HB 513 established a four-year term.

List of Poets Laureate
 Franklin L. Wood (1929)
 Vivian Laramore Rader (1931-1975)
 Edmund Skellings (1980-2012) 
 Peter Meinke (2015-present)

See also

 Poet laureate
 List of U.S. states' poets laureate
 United States Poet Laureate

References

 
Florida culture
American Poets Laureate